African-American architects are those in the architectural profession who are members of the African diaspora in the United States.

Their work in the more distant past was often overlooked or outright erased from the historical records due to the racist social dynamics at play in the country (and also due to the proxied nature of the profession itself), but the black members of the profession—and their historic contributions—have become somewhat more recognized since.

History

19th and 20th-centuries 
The first African American architects appeared in the mid-1800s. Being African American and trying to become an architect in a White-dominated profession, especially in the 1800s-1900s was difficult. Racism towards African Americans was prevalent in the 1800s-1900s and this was amplified by the addition and enforcement of Jim Crow laws. Jim Crow Laws enforced segregation of White and Blacks, therefore promoting direct racism. Many African American architects working during and after this time period faced obstacles due to overt racism perpetuated by the society and culture of the United States.

Schools 
Claflin University (formerly Claflin College) was the first historically Black school to offer an architectural drawing course, starting around the 1890s. Other early Black schools for architecture programs included Hampton University (formerly Hampton Institute), Florida A&M University, Howard University, North Carolina A&T State University, Prairie View A&M University (formerly Prairie View A&M College), Southern University, and Tuskegee University (formerly Tuskegee Normal and Industrial Institute).

Men 
Some architects such as Julian Francis Abele, Louis Arnett Stuart Bellinger, and Paul Revere Williams were able to obtain architectural degrees from top universities, architectural licenses, and positions at top architectural firms. However, clients were often opposed to having their projects overseen by an African American architect. This resulted in many African American architects working without credit.

Julian Francis Abele 
Julian Francis Abele (1881–1950), was the first African American to graduate from the University of Pennsylvania School of Architecture (1902). After traveling and studying in Europe under the sponsorship of Horace Trumbauer, Abele returned to Philadelphia and joined Trumbauer's firm in 1906. He served as chief designer from 1909 to 1938. The Philadelphia Museum of Art was a collaboration between Trumbauer's firm and that of Zantzinger, Borie and Medary. While another Trumbauer architect, Howell Lewis Shay, is credited with the building's plan and massing, the presentation drawings are in Abele's hand. It was not until after Trumbauer's death that Abele signed his architectural drawings, or claimed credit for being the main designer of Duke University's west campus. Abele also helped design the Widener Memorial Library at Harvard.

Paul Revere Williams 
Paul Revere Williams (1894–1980), was raised in the Los Angeles area where he attended school. After Graduating from high school, Williams attended the Los Angeles School of Art and eventually studied at University of Southern California (USC) (class of 1919). Williams then worked for established firms run by Wilbert D. Cook Jr. and George D. Hall. Williams received his architecture license from the state of California, and was the first black person in the American Institute of Architects (AIA), joining the Southern California Chapter in 1923, and the first black person to become a fellow of the AIA, in 1957. In 1921, he became the first African American Architect west of the Mississippi. Williams was also a member of the Los Angeles Planning Commission in 1920, the California Housing Commission in 1947, the National Monument Commission in 1929, and the National Housing Commission in 1953. Williams designed residential buildings as well as churches, schools, and other commercial buildings.

Women 
Both African American men and women dealt with similar issues regarding race, but African American women in the mid-1800 to 1900s dealt with discrimination based on sex as well. The first African American women architects, such as Norma Merrick Sklarek and Beverly Loraine Greene, were faced with many challenges as they completed their journey of becoming architects. For years prior, the architecture industry was dominated by white men. In the 1900s, it was difficult for an African American man to receive a fair chance to become employed at a firm because of racism. On top of this, women were fighting for equal rights. Women architects not only had to overcome many setbacks due to their race but also due to their gender. Some common setbacks faced by Sklarek included being denied entry into the world of architecture, and not receiving recognition for their work. African American women had to work extremely hard just to have the chance to be educated in the field. As Sklarek demonstrated throughout her career, it was possible for African American women to excel in the architectural world, but the numbers of women within the field were low, and seem to have remained low from the time Sklarek was actively working to more recent years.

Norma Merrick Sklarek 
Norma Merrick Sklarek (1928–2012), was the first black woman to become a licensed architect in both New York state (1954) and in California (1962). She graduated from Columbia University and worked for the architecture firms SOM and Gruen and Associates. She also was the first black woman to join the American Institute of Architects. Sklarek collaborated with Cesar Pelli on projects that include the Pacific Design Center and the U.S. Embassy in Tokyo.

Beverly Loraine Greene 
Beverly Lorraine Greene (1915–1957), was the first black woman to become a licensed architect in the US. She was based out of Illinois, and started her practice in Chicago. She struggled to be noticed because of her race. Greene went on to work on international projects such as UNESCO headquarters in Paris, and designed buildings for NYU.

21st-century 
Although the culture and society in the United States have improved from the 19th and 20th centuries, African American architects and other people of color who desire to become an architect continue to deal with a lack of diversity in the field. Only 2% of licensed architects in the United States are Black or African American, and fewer than 1 in 5 new architects identify as a racial or ethnic minority, according to the National Council of Architectural Registration Boards.

The Directory of African American Architects maintains an ongoing list of licensed African American architects. In 2007, there were 100,000 licensed architects in the United States, however only 1,571 of them were African American and 186 of these are African American women. On October 24, 2019 there were 2,300 African American architects listed, including 467 women. African American architects represent about 2% of all licensed architects (116,000) and African American women represent approximately 0.4%, according to the National Council of Architectural Registration Boards (NCARB). There are several organizations and initiatives focused on increasing representation including the National Organization of Minority Architects, Riding the Vortex, 400 FORWARD, Hip Hop Architecture, First 500, and Beyond the Built.

List of African-American architects

Women 
Elizabeth Carter Brooks (1867–1951), she was an architect as well as an educator and social activist; she was one of the first to recognize the importance of preserving historical buildings in the United States.
Georgia Louise Harris Brown (1918–1999), is considered to be the second African American woman to become a licensed architect in the United States. She worked in Chicago and Brazil with Mies.
Alma Fairfax Murray Carlisle (born 1927), was a Los Angeles-based preservationist in the mid-20th century.
Alberta Jeannette Cassell is one of the first two African American women to graduate from Cornell University in 1948, along with Martha Cassell Thompson. She became a naval architect with the United States Naval Sea Systems Command between in the 1970s.
Ivenue Love-Stanley, co-principal (with her husband William J. Stanley III) of the Atlanta-based firm, Stanley, Love-Stanley, PC.
Cheryl L. McAfee (born c. 1958), CEO of McAfee3, she led the design and construction of sports venues of the 1996 Olympics in Atlanta. She was the first women to receive an architecture license in the state of Kansas in 1990.
Helen Eugenia Parker designed Trinity Hospital in Detroit.
 Michaele Pride-Wells (born 1956), was sole proprietor of RE: Architecture in California (1989–1996); she is a Professor of Architecture at the University of New Mexico.
 Hermine E. Ricketts (1956–2019; also known as Hermine Ricketts-Carroll), Jamaican-born and founder of HER Architects, Inc. in 1986, located in Coral Gables, Florida; in 2013, she led a zoning legal battle in Florida to grow produce in front yards.
Martha Cassell Thompson is one of the first two African American women to graduate from Cornell University in 1948, along with Alberta Jeannette Cassell. She was the chief restoration architect for the National Cathedral.
Roberta Washington, founder of Roberta Washington Architects, PC. located in New York City, a full architectural design and planning services

Men

References

Further reading 
 Howard University's Moorland-Spingarn Research Center and the "Archive of African American Architects", the largest archival repository on African American Architects
 Wilson, Dreck Spurlock. African American Architects: A Biographical Dictionary, 1865–1945, 2004
 Hudson, Karen E. Paul R. Williams, Architect: A Legacy of Style. Rizzoli International Publications, 1993. 
 Kiisk, Linda. "20 on 20/20 vision: Perspectives on Diversity and Design." 2003 
 Kilment, Stephen A. "Young African American Women Architects sharpen ties to their communities." 2007. 
 Landmark, Ted. "Isolation and Diversity in Architecture" 
 Mitchell, Melissa. "Research project spotlights African American Architects from University of Illinois." 2006. 
 Williams, Paul R. The Will and the Way: Paul R. Williams, Architect. Rizzoli International Publications, 1994. 

 
 African
Architects
Architects, African